The Tokelau national rugby league team represents Tokelau in rugby league football and first participated in international competition in 1986.

Tokelau has participated four times in the Pacific Cup: in 1986, 1988, 1992 and 2006.

Tokelau is expected to make a return to international Rugby League with the planned introduction of a new formalise the structure for Rugby League. It's envisaged from this symposium that rugby league will be able to officially form the Tokelau Rugby League Association (TRLA). The TRLA will be the driving force behind Tokelau's rugby league development and also allow the game to receive support from the Tokelau government.
 
In December 2011 the Tokelau National Sports Coordinator made contact with the Rugby League International Federation (RLIF) to express their ambitions to come back to the rugby league fold. After the TRLA is formalised in February/March 2012 the first goal of the body is to obtain membership of the Asia Pacific Rugby League Confederation (APRLC).

Heritage Players
Sam Panapa
Francis Meli
Vince Mellars
Alehana Mara
Marvin Filipo
Bureta Faraimo
Renouf Atoni

Results
Note: The Winning team is given first.

Pacific Cup 1986
 Western Samoa 34–12 Tokelau
 Tonga 26–22 Tokelau

Pacific Cup 1988
 Cook Islands 19–10 Tokelau
 Western Samoa 40–18 Tokelau

Pacific Cup 1992
 Tokelau 26–18 American Samoa
 Australia Aborigines 46–18 Tokelau
 New Zealand Māori 34–18 Tokelau
 Tokelau 44–8 Norfolk Island
 Tokelau beat Cook Islands (9-aside)
 Tokelau 8 beat American Samoa 8 (9-aside semi Final)
 Winners of the 9-aside Final Tokelau 18 v Fiji 18

Pacific Cup 2006
 Tonga 62–0 Tokelau
 New Zealand Māori 64–4 Tokelau
 Tokelau 34–28 Samoa

Pacific Games 2019 (rugby league 9s)

 Cook Islands 22–4 Tokelau
 Cook Islands 22–20 Tokelau
 Solomon Islands 24–18 Tokelau
 Tokelau 8–4 Solomon Islands
 Fiji 30–4 Tokelau

National stadium

References

National rugby league teams
Rugby league in Tokelau
R